Benjamin Lewis Rice  (17 July 1837 – 10 July 1927), popularly known as B. L. Rice, was a British historian, archaeologist and educationist. He is known for his pioneering work in deciphering inscriptions, especially in Kannada, and in Sanskrit inscriptions in the Kingdom of Mysore. Rice's researches were published as the voluminous Epigraphia Carnatica which contains translations of about 9000 inscriptions he found in the Old Mysore area. Rice also compiled the much acclaimed Mysore Gazetteer which still remains the primary source of information for most places in Mysore and neighbouring Coorg. Rice served with distinction in the Mysore civil service and as first Director of the Mysore State Archaeology Department.

Early life and education 

Benjamin Lewis Rice was born in Bangalore on 17 July 1837 to Rev. Benjamin Holt Rice who was associated with the London Missionary Society (LMS). Rev. Rice was a Kannada scholar and wrote books in Kannada on arithmetic, geography and history. He even brought forth a Kannada translation of the Bible. The Rice Memorial Church, located at Avenue Road, Bangalore is named after Rev. Benjamin Holt Rice. Rice had his early education in Mysore State and graduated in the United Kingdom in 1860.

Career 

Upon graduating, Rice returned to India where he was appointed Principal of the Bangalore High School (later Central College). Five years later, he joined the Mysore Civil Service as Inspector of Schools for Mysore and Coorg.  In 1868, he acted as Director of Public Instruction when John Garrett returned to the United Kingdom on leave. From 1881 to 1883, Rice served as Chief Census Officer for Mysore State and was in 1883, appointed Secretary of the Education Department of Mysore.

In 1884, Rice was appointed head of the Mysore State Archaeology Department, the first to occupy the post. As the head of the archaeological department, Rice toured the whole of the state from 1886 till his retirement in 1906, documenting his findings in the Epigraphia Carnatica.

Epigraphy 

Rice's interest in epigraphy was triggered when in 1873, a certain Major Dixon showed him photographs of a few inscriptions of the area and requested him to provide a translation. That same year, Rice was appointed to compile gazetteers for Mysore and the neighbouring Coorg Province. The gazetteers were much acclaimed earned praise for Rice.

In 1879, Rice published about 9,000 inscriptions in Sanskrit, Kannada and Tamil in the book Mysore Inscriptions. In 1882, he published a catalog of all inscriptions found in the princely state.

During his tours as inspector, he came across hundreds of ancient stone inscriptions, language and script of which was very different from the one in vogue. With the help of assistants, he edited, translated, and transliterated thousands of inscriptions. Rice alone is credited with finding nine-thousand inscriptions.

During his tenure, Rice discovered Roman coins in parts of Karnataka, as also some Ashokan edicts. This was an astonishing discovery, and led to the reconstruction of much of India's glorious history. Rice established that an important dynasty which founded the kingdom of Nepal owed its origin to Nanyadeva, who came from the Ganga dynasty of Mysore.

Just before his retirement in 1906, Rice published six volumes of the Biblotheca Carnatica, a collection of major Kannada literary texts.

Works

Notes

External links
 

1837 births
1927 deaths
Scientists from Bangalore
Kingdom of Mysore
20th-century Indian archaeologists
Companions of the Order of the Indian Empire
19th-century Indian educational theorists
20th-century Indian educational theorists
19th-century Indian archaeologists